Arctagrostis is a genus of Arctic and Subarctic plants in the grass family, native to colder parts of Europe, Asia, and North America.

 Species
 Arctagrostis arundinacea (Trin.) Beal - Siberia, Russian Far East, Alaska including Aleutians, Yukon, Northwest Territories, Alberta, British Columbia
 Arctagrostis latifolia (R.Br.) Griseb. - Finland, Norway, Svalbard, European + Asiatic Russia, Kazakhstan, Mongolia, Alaska, Greenland, Canada (Yukon, Northwest Territories, Nunavut, Alberta, Manitoba, British Columbia, Labrador, Ontario, Québec)

 formerly included
see Dupontia 
 Arctagrostis humilis - Dupontia fisheri

See also 
 List of Poaceae genera

References

External links 
 Grassbase - The World Online Grass Flora

Pooideae
Poaceae genera